Jenny Nordberg is a New York-based, Swedish journalist best known for her book The Underground Girls of Kabul: In Search of a Hidden Resistance in Afghanistan published by Crown Publishing Group (New York, NY) in 2014.

Life
She has B.A. from Stockholm University in Law and Journalism and an  M.A. from Columbia University in Journalism in 2003.  She is a foreign correspondent for Swedish newspaper Svenska Dagbladet.

She is also a writer and producer of documentary films on topics such as nuclear proliferation in Pakistan, refugees in Iraq, and how the global financial crisis has affected Europe.

Awards 
 Winner of the 2015 J. Anthony Lukas Book Prize (for The Underground Girls of Kabul)
 Salon 2014 Authors' Favorite Book (for The Underground Girls of Kabul)
 Buzzfeed's Best Nonfiction Books of 2014 (for The Underground Girls of Kabul)
 A Business Insider Best Book of 2014 (for The Underground Girls of Kabul)
 A Columbus Dispatch Best Book of 2014 (for The Underground Girls of Kabul)
 A Publishers Weekly Best Book of 2014 (for The Underground Girls of Kabul)
 A PopMatters Best Book of 2014 (for The Underground Girls of Kabul)
 An FP Interrupted Best Book of 2014 (for The Underground Girls of Kabul)
 An IPI Global Observatory Recommended Book for 2015 (for The Underground Girls of Kabul)
 A TruthDig Book of the Year, 2014 (for The Underground Girls of Kabul)
 Finalist for the Goodreads Choice Award, Nonfiction (for The Underground Girls of Kabul)
 Robert F. Kennedy Award for Excellence in Journalism, Robert F. Kennedy Center for Justice and Human Rights, 2010, for television documentary of Afghan women
 Investigative Reporters and Editors award 
 Foreningen Gravande Journalister award

References

External links 
The Underground Girls of Kabul website
Twitter account
Personal webpage

Swedish journalists
Living people
Stockholm University alumni
Columbia University Graduate School of Journalism alumni
Year of birth missing (living people)